Górki Borze  is a village in the administrative district of Gmina Korytnica, within Węgrów County, Masovian Voivodeship, in east-central Poland.

The village has a population of 165.

Zofia Węgierska, a Polish columnist and writer, comes from the village.

In the years 1975-1998, the town administratively belonged to the Siedlce Voivodeship.

References

Villages in Węgrów County